Sir Makere Rangiatea "Ralph" Love  (16 September 1907 – 22 August 1994) was a New Zealand Māori public servant and leader of Te Āti Awa. One of his brothers was Eruera Te Whiti o Rongomai Love (18 May 1905 – 12 July 1942), a New Zealand rugby player, interpreter and military leader.

Biography
He was born at Homebush on Arapaoa Island, Queen Charlotte Sound. His parents, Wi Hapi Pakau Love and Ripeka Wharawhara Love (28 June 1882 – 6 April 1953), who had ten children, seven of whom survived infancy, belonged to senior families of Te Āti Awa, Taranaki and Ngati Ruanui, with connections to most of the iwi of Taranaki, Wellington and the northern South Island. His mother Ripeka Wharawhara Love was a New Zealand community leader.

Love was a direct descendant of Ngati Te Whiti and Ngati Tawhirikura chiefs who controlled Petone and Ngauranga at the time of the Treaty of Waitangi. He was educated at Petone West School and Petone District High School. His father arranged for him to join the Native Trust Office as a cadet in 1925. Soon after, he became a clerk in the Native Department. On 6 May 1933, he married Flora Heberley, the daughter of carver Thomas "Tamati" Heberley. They had a daughter, Marie Nui Te He, and a son, Ralph Heberley Ngātata.

When the Second World War broke out Love joined the army, but was declared medically unfit for overseas service: in 1927 he had broken ribs playing rugby and developed tuberculosis. He served as a recruiting and liaison officer with the Māori War Effort Organisation, and in 1946 was appointed a justice of the peace. From 1944–49, he served (at first unofficially) as parliamentary private secretary to MP and cabinet minister Sir Eruera Tirikatene. Love was Tirikatene's private secretary again in 1957–60, and worked closely with him and his successor and daughter, Whetu Tirikatene-Sullivan, for many years.

He was an active supporter of the New Zealand Labour Party. He was heavily involved in organising the inaugural conference of the Māori Women's Welfare League. His work in the Native (later Māori Affairs) Department included stints as assistant controller of social welfare, conversion officer and deputy registrar to the Māori Land Court. He was deputy chairman of the Wellington Tenths Trust. In 1962, he was elected to the Wellington City Council, and became Māori welfare officer for Wellington under the Department of Māori Affairs. In 1965, he retired from Māori Affairs and was elected to the Petone mayoralty on a Labour Party platform. In January 1967 he lost office after being convicted of technically breaching the Local Authorities (Members’ Contracts) Act 1954 when he voted to increase his own pay. At the subsequent by-election he was re-elected mayor, holding office until October 1968 when he was defeated by George Gee.

He petitioned to have the Treaty of Waitangi enshrined in legislation, and attempted to gain a guarantee that Māori representation in Parliament would be retained or increased. He also petitioned against proposed immigration legislation which would allow the British government to override the provision in the treaty for all the rights and privileges of British citizenship to be accorded to Māori, including the right to enter Britain. He even wrote directly to the British prime minister, Margaret Thatcher, objecting to this change.

He died in Wellington on 30 July 1994, the tangihanga was held at Pipitea and Te Tatau-o-te-Po marae, with the final service at Saint Paul's Cathedral, Wellington.

Honours
In the 1975 Queen's Birthday Honours, Love was appointed a Companion of the Queen's Service Order for public services, for services to local-body affairs and the Māori people. He was appointed a Knight Bachelor in the 1987 Queen's Birthday Honours, for services to the Māori people and the community.

References

Sources
NZET Centre

1907 births
1994 deaths
Te Āti Awa people
Mayors of places in the Wellington Region
Māori mayors
Māori politicians
New Zealand Labour Party politicians
Wellington City Councillors
New Zealand Māori public servants
Companions of the Queen's Service Order
New Zealand Knights Bachelor
20th-century New Zealand politicians
People from the Marlborough Sounds
Ngāti Ruanui people
Taranaki (iwi)
New Zealand justices of the peace
New Zealand military personnel of World War II